Bruneria is a genus of slant-faced grasshoppers, in the subfamily Gomphocerinae, from north-western America. There are at least three described species in Bruneria.

Species
These three species belong to the genus Bruneria:
 Bruneria brunnea (Thomas, 1871) (bruner slant-faced grasshopper)
 Bruneria shastana (Scudder, 1881) (Shasta slant-faced grasshopper)
 Bruneria yukonensis Vickery, 1969 (Yukon slant-faced grasshopper)

References

Further reading

 
 
 

Gomphocerinae
Articles created by Qbugbot